Lutetium tantalate is a chemical compound of lutetium, tantalum and oxygen with the formula LuTaO4. With a density of 9.81 g/cm3, this salt is the densest known white stable material.  (Although thorium dioxide ThO2 is also white and has a higher density of 10 g/cm3, it is radioactively unstable; while not radioactive enough to make it unstable as a material, even its low rate of decay is still too much for certain uses such as phosphors for detecting ionising radiation.) The white color and high density of LuTaO4 make it ideal for phosphor applications, though the high cost of lutetium is a hindrance.

Properties
Under standard conditions, LuTaO4 has a monoclinic (labeled as M'; Pearson symbol mP12, Space group = P2/a, No 13) fergusonite-type crystal structure. This can be changed to an I2/a (M) structure by annealing at 1,600 °C. Both structures are stable under standard conditions. In the M' structure, the lutetium atom is 8-fold coordinated with oxygen and forms a distorted antiprism with a C2 site symmetry. The structure of lutetium tantalate is identical to that of yttrium tantalate (YTaO4) and gadolinium tantalate (GdTaO4).

Lutetium tantalate itself is weakly fluorescent. Bright emission is achieved by incorporating small amounts (about 1%) of various rare-earth dopants during the crystal growth process, for example, with europium (sharp red line at 610 nm), samarium (red: 610 nm), terbium (green-yellow: 495 and 545 nm lines), praseodymium (red: 615 nm), thulium (blue: 455 nm), dysprosium (orange: 580 nm) or niobium (blue: 400 nm, broad peak). The emission is best excited by electrons, X-rays or ultraviolet light at 220 nm. The high density of LuTaO4 favors X-ray excitation, which has relatively more efficient, stronger absorption in LuTaO4, compared to other materials. LuTaO4 also exhibits thermoluminescence — it glows in the dark when heated after illumination.

Preparation
To prepare a sample of lutetium tantalate, powders of lutetium and tantalum oxides (Lu2O3 and Ta2O5) are mixed and annealed at a temperature above 1,200 °C for several hours. To prepare a phosphor, a small fraction of appropriate material, such as an oxide of another rare-earth metal, is added to the mixture before annealing. After cooling, the product is leached with water, washed, filtered and dried, resulting in a white powder consisting of micrometre-sized particles of LuTaO4.

References

Lutetium compounds
Tantalates
Phosphors and scintillators